is a Japanese footballer currently playing as a midfielder for Yokohama F. Marinos.

Career statistics

Club
.

Notes

Honours

Club
Yokohama F. Marinos
 J1 League: 2022

References

2003 births
Living people
Association football people from Kanagawa Prefecture
Japanese footballers
Japan youth international footballers
Association football midfielders
J1 League players
Yokohama F. Marinos players